"Rap das Armas" is a 1990s song originally written and performed by Brazilian duo Júnior e Leonardo. It has lyrics in Brazilian Portuguese written on the melody of the 1986 song "Your Love" by the English rock band The Outfield.

Brazilian duo Cidinho and Doca, made up of MC Cidinho and MC Doca, recorded and released a cover of the song, making it an international hit both in 2008 and in 2009. The duo are two prominent proibidão rappers in Brazil, proibidão referring to songs which are prohibited airplay by order of the Brazilian courts due to alleged crime apology.

The song enjoyed a considerable amount of success in the mid-1990s. It resurfaced when it was used as the soundtrack of a popular Brazilian film released in 2007, Elite Squad, but it was withdrawn two weeks after its release.

Following the song success, the record has been subject to many remixes from 2008 to at least 2011, like that of Dutch Dj Quintino, which became popular throughout 2009 in European nightclubs and reached #1 in The Netherlands and in Sweden.

Early-to-mid 1990s original version 
The song is considered as part of the "Funk carioca" movement that started with the release of the album Funk Brasil in 1989, produced by DJ Marlboro, a compilation which is considered the milestone of the music genre movement. The movement itself was then solidified with a string of albums and songs including the first-ever version of "Rap das Armas", written by siblings MCs Júnior e Leonardo in 1992 and performed by them in 1994. The song started as a praise to Rio de Janeiro's beauties, but eventually became a protest on urban violence. Although the text called for peace and was against violence, it was still prohibited for mentioning names of a great number of weapons including Intratec (a semi-automatic pistol), .45 ACP, FMK, Uzi, 7.62×51mm NATO and 7.65×21mm Parabellum rifles, hand grenades, .44 Magnum, Beretta, Madsen (referred in the song as an "android hunter") and automatic weapons. Leonardo said he picked the names of these weapons in his day job as a newsstand attendant. The refrain of the record was taken from a 1986 song, "Your Love" by the English rock band The Outfield, replacing the lyrics with the sound of a machine gun, imitated by the rendition "pa ra pa pa..."

2000s Cidinho e Doca version 
Since then, MCs Cidinho and Doca were a popular duo who had released the song "Rap da felicidade": they were asked by MCs Júnior e Leonardo to join in the refrain of the song; soon afterwards, Cidinho e Doca released their own version of the song without Júnior e Leonardo, changing also the names of some of the firearms used, adding AR-15, 12-gauge, 5.7×28mm pistols, Uru, Glock, AK-47, Winchester rifle, M16, .50 and .30 calibre weapons. But Júnior and Leonardo criticized the new version, saying it went for the opposite message they were seeking, and the new version seemed to praise violence instead of criticizing it. Cidinho and Doca were not sued because that version "was not commercialized", due to its lack of recorded version and radio airplay.

2007: "Elite Squad" film soundtrack 
The 1990s song was reused with amended lyrics as soundtrack of the 2007 film Elite Squad, directed by José Padilha. This film soon became the highest-grossing one of that year in Brazil. The film version of the song as interpreted by MCs Cidinho and Doca became very popular as a result.

The lyrics of the remixed version were modified in order to make it sound like a social protest, which was not the intention of the original 1990s version. The music was also inspired by kuduro, informally known as "funk carioca of Angola". The filmmakers still preferred using the original version of MCs Júnior e Leonardo.

The song vividly illustrates the daily invasion of favelas by the elite squad of the police in order to fight drug trafficking, as it is clear from its own title. Its lyrics reference the fireweapons popular among drug dealers and police officers.

Despite its popularity, "Rap das Armas" was never played on the Brazilian radio due to its controversial nature and it was abruptly removed from the Elite Squad film soundtrack album two weeks after its release, because it allegedly praises drug consumption, and seems to defend drug dealers and criminal factions side in Rio de Janeiro's war on crime.

2008-2011: "Rap das Armas" song remixes 

European DJs made many remix versions of the song based more on the Cidinho and Doca rendition rather than the original Júnior e Leonardo one.

The first well known remix was made in Portugal in 2008. Consequently, it became a huge hit there. This version appeared in many European countries and was a big hit almost everywhere.

Dutch Dj Quintino made his own version that reached the number 1 in The Netherlands in February 2009, staying at the top of the chart for 2 weeks.

"Rap das Armas" was an even bigger hit in Sweden, where it stayed at the top of the Swedish singles charts for a total of 4 weeks in the summer of 2009. The supporters of Stockholm football team Djurgårdens IF Fotboll like to sing the machine gun-like chorus during the games of their club.

In 2011 rapper Flo Rida released music with samples of this song, with the recording being produced by DJ Frank E. However, it has not been included in the Flo Rida's 2012 album Wild Ones.

Other versions and parodies 
The song has been subject to many versions, remixes and even parodies by various disc jockeys throughout Europe.

Well-known versions include a dance one known as "Lucana Club Mix", a remix by "Rockstarzz featuring Antoine Montana and DJ Bo", "Parapapa" by "DJ Jan" and a parody by "DJ Maurice and Boldheadz", entitled "Parapapaprika".

South African artist Snotkop used the chorus and the melody in his song "Parapapa", though the lyrics in Afrikaans have no connections with the original ones.

There is also a Greek version, by Laïko music singer Giorgos Tsalikis, but it also hasn't lyrics related to those of the original song, which are instead rewritten in Greek language.

Charts

Weekly charts

Year-end charts

References

External links

Cidinho e Doca Official website
Cidinho e Doca Myspace site
A Swedish translation of Cidionho e Doca's version

Brazilian songs
2009 singles
Number-one singles in Sweden
Dutch Top 40 number-one singles
1989 songs
2007 songs
2008 singles